May Nilsson (5 May 1921 – 7 November 2009) was a Swedish alpine skier, born in Åre. She won a bronze medal during the 1939 world championships in Zakopane at the women's slalom event.

References

1921 births
2009 deaths
Swedish female alpine skiers
Olympic alpine skiers of Sweden
Alpine skiers at the 1948 Winter Olympics
Swedish expatriates in France
20th-century Swedish women